Pudhu Nellu Pudhu Naathu is a 1991 Indian Tamil-language film directed by Bharathiraja. This film marked the debut for supporting artist. Napoleon as well as leading actress, Sukanya. It was released on 15 March 1991.

Plot 

This movie tells the story of battle between an evil and ruthless moneylender played by Napoleon and the family who was is victim who find their footing, climbs back up and seeks vengeance with the women in both families becoming pawns.

Cast 
Rahul as Kathirvel
Sukanya as Krishnaveni
Ram Arjun as Muthuvel
Rudhra as Marikozhunthu
Napoleon as Sankaralingam
Ponvannan as Veeraiya
Renuka as Thaayamma
Ashok

Production 
Pudhu Nellu Pudhu Naathu is the debut film for Napoleon and Sukanya as actors; the former was then 27 years old, playing a character more than twice his age. Arivumathi worked as an assistant director after a previous film he started, Ullen Ayya, was shelved.

Soundtrack 
The music was composed by Ilaiyaraaja while lyrics were written by Muthulingam, Ilaiyaraaja and Gangai Amaran.

References

External links 

1990s Tamil-language films
1991 films
Films directed by Bharathiraja
Films scored by Ilaiyaraaja